Sachindra Nath Bakshi (25 December 1904 – 23 November 1984) was a prominent Indian revolutionary  and one of the founding members of Hindustan Republican Association (HRA, which after 1928 became the Hindustan Socialist Republican Association or HSRA)  that was created to carry out revolutionary activities against the British Empire in India.

He  was one of revolutionaries who participated  in the Kakori train robbery and two months later he and his friends were sent to Barrack number 11 in the Lucknow Central Jail (now called Lucknow District Jail) and was sentenced to life for the same.

References

External links
 Freedom fighters from Varanasi
 Trial

Revolutionaries from Varanasi
1904 births
1984 deaths
Hindustan Socialist Republican Association
Bharatiya Jana Sangh politicians
Politicians from Varanasi
Members of the Uttar Pradesh Legislative Assembly
Uttar Pradesh politicians